The UWA World Tag Team Championship is a tag team professional wrestling championship created by the Mexican Universal Wrestling Association (UWA) and defended there until the UWA closed in 1995. After the UWA's closing, the title was inactive until 2008, when El Dorado Wrestling revived the title. On March 26, 2008, Kagetora and Kota Ibushi won the title in Tokyo, Japan at El Dorado's Eye of the Treasure event, defeating Mazada and Nosawa. It has since been defended in several promotions, including Kohaku Wrestling Wars, Michinoku Pro Wrestling and Union Pro Wrestling. There have been a total of 30 reigns shared between 22 different teams consisting of 41 distinctive champions.

As it was a professional wrestling championship, the championship was not won not by actual competition, but by a scripted ending to a match determined by the bookers and match makers. On occasion the promotion declares a championship vacant, which means there is no champion at that point in time. This can either be due to a storyline, or real life issues such as a champion suffering an injury being unable to defend the championship, or leaving the company.

Title history

|-

Combined reigns 

By team
{| class="wikitable sortable" style="text-align: center"
!Rank
!Team
!No. ofreigns
!Combined days
|-
!1
|Speed of Sounds/Yapper Man #1 and Yapper Man #2 || 4 || 1,490
|-
!2
|  || 2 ||style="background-color:#bbeeff"| 1,044¤
|-
!3
|  || 2 || 856
|-
!4
| Ikuto Hidaka and Minoru Fujita  || 2 || 590
|-
!5
|  and Taro Nohashi || 3 || 535
|-
!6
| Masamune and Minoru Fujita || 1 || 344
|-
!7
| Hub and Eisa8 || 1 || 251
|-
!8
|  and Perro Aguayo || 1 || 220
|-
!9
|  || 1 || 183
|-
!10
|  || 1 || 163
|-
!11
|  || 1 || 161
|-
!12
| Jinsei Shinzaki and The Great Sasuke || 1 || 152
|-
!13
| Fuma and Isami Kodaka || 1 || 146
|-
!14
| Masato Shibata and Shuji Ishikawa || 1 || 144
|-
!15
|  || 1 || 133
|-
!16
| Hiroshi Fukuda and Men's Teioh || 1 || 126
|-
!17
|  and Yasu Urano || 1 || 81
|-
!18
|  || 1 || 75
|-
!19
|style="background-color:#FFE6BD"| Kohei Kinoshita and Yasshi † || 1 || +
|-
!20
|  and Scorpio Jr. || 1 || 7
|-
!21
|  and Kendo || 1 || <1
|-
!rowspan=3|22
| Kagetora and Kota Ibushi || 1 ||style="background-color:#bbeeff"| ¤
|-
| Nosawa Rongai and Mazada || 1 ||style="background-color:#bbeeff"| ¤
|-
| Riki Choshu and Gran Hamada || 1 ||style="background-color:#bbeeff"| ¤

By wrestler 
{|class="wikitable sortable" style="text-align: center"
!Rank
!Wrestler
!data-sort-type="number"|No. ofreigns
!data-sort-type="number"|Combined days	
|-
!rowspan=2|1
|Hercules Senga/Yapper Man #1 || 4 || 1,490
|-
|Tsutomu Oosugi/Yapper Man #2 || 4 || 1,490
|-
!rowspan=2|3
| Villano IV || 2 ||style="background-color:#bbeeff"| 1,044¤
|-
| Villano V || 2 ||style="background-color:#bbeeff"| 1,044¤
|-
!5
| Minoru Fujita || 3 || 907
|-
!rowspan=2|6
| Brahman Kei || 2 || 856
|-
| Brahman Shu || 2 || 856
|-
!8
| Ikuto Hidaka || 2 || 563
|-
!rowspan=2|9
|  || 3 || 535
|-
| Taro Nohashi || 3 || 535
|-
!11
| Masamune || 1 || 344
|-
!rowspan=2|12
| Hub || 1 || 251
|-
| Eisa8 || 1 || 251
|-
!14
|  || 3 ||style="background-color:#bbeeff"| 220¤
|-
!15
| Perro Aguayo || 1 || 220
|-
!rowspan=2|16
| Ayumu Gunji || 1 || 183
|-
| Rui Hyugaji || 1 || 183
|-
!rowspan=2|18
| Ken45° || 1 || 163
|-
| Kengo || 1 || 163
|-
!rowspan=2|20
| Silver King || 1 || 161
|-
| El Texano || 1 || 161
|-
!rowspan=2|22
| Jinsei Shinzaki || 1 || 152
|-
| The Great Sasuke || 1 || 152
|-
!rowspan=2|24
| Fuma || 1 || 146
|-
| Isami Kodaka || 1 || 146
|-
!rowspan=2|26
| Masato Shibata || 1 || 141
|-
| Shuji Ishikawa || 1 || 141
|-
!rowspan=2|28
| Dan Kroffat || 1 || 133
|-
| Doug Furnas || 1 || 133
|-
!rowspan=2|30
| Hiroshi Fukuda || 1 || 126
|-
| Men's Teioh || 1 || 126
|-
!rowspan=2|32
|  || 1 || 81
|-
| Yasu Urano || 1 || 81
|-
!rowspan=2|34
| Brazo de Oro || 1 || 75
|-
| Brazo de Plata || 1 || 75
|-
!rowspan=2|36
|style="background-color:#FFE6BD"| Kohei Kinoshita † || 1 || +
|-
|style="background-color:#FFE6BD"| Yasushi Tsujimoto † || 1 || +
|-
!rowspan=2|38
| Emilio Charles Jr. || 1 || 7
|-
| Scorpio Jr. || 1 || 7
|-
!40
| Kendo || 1 || <1
|-
!rowspan=5|41
| Kagetora || 1 ||style="background-color:#bbeeff"| ¤
|-
| Kota Ibushi || 1 || style="background-color:#bbeeff"| ¤
|-
| Mazada || 1 ||style="background-color:#bbeeff"| ¤
|-
| Nosawa Rongai || 1 ||style="background-color:#bbeeff"| ¤
|-
| Riki Choshu || 1 || style="background-color:#bbeeff"| ¤

Footnotes

References

El Dorado Wrestling championships
Tag team wrestling championships
Universal Wrestling Association championships
World professional wrestling championships
Michinoku Pro Wrestling champions